Fedrilate is a centrally acting cough suppressant. It was patented as a mucolytic by UCB in 1971, but was never brought to market in the US. In the Netherlands, it has been marketed as Tussefan and in combination with guaifenesin as Tussefan expectorans.

Synthesis

Sodamide alkylation between benzyl cyanide (1) and bis(chloroethyl)ether [111-44-4] (2) gives 4-phenyloxane-4-carbonitrile [1202-81-9] (3). Hydrolysis of the nitrile gives 4-phenyloxane-4-carboxylic acid [182491-21-0] (4).  Treatment with thionyl chloride gives the corresponding acid chloride (5). Ester formation with 4-(morpholin-4-yl)butan-2-ol [858440-45-6] (6) gives Fedrilate proper (7).

References

Antitussives
4-Morpholinyl compunds
Carboxylate esters
Tetrahydropyrans